Brad Booth (born 1976) is a Canadian professional poker player, known for his appearances on the GSN series High Stakes Poker, where he bought in for a "cool million."

Early life
Booth was born in Vancouver, British Columbia, Canada, on September 20, 1976.

Career
In the 13th episode of the 3rd season of High Stakes Poker, Booth stated that he has been playing poker every day for fourteen years – first in Vancouver, then Calgary, and then in the Yukon, hence his nickname "Yukon Brad". According to an interview on Mediocre Poker Radio, Booth was a victim of the Ultimate Bet cheating scandal, and may have been cheated out of $2 million. He continued to play poker online after being cheated, but without his former success. Since 2008, he has reportedly lost $4.2 million playing poker.

Booth appeared on the second season of NBC's Poker After Dark, on the episode "International Week," and finished in 2nd place to Patrik Antonius. Their heads-up clash was notable for the length of time it lasted, breaking previous Poker After Dark heads-up records. As of 2009, his total live-tournament winnings reportedly exceed $710,000.

In November 2009, Booth left Full Tilt Poker to become the spokesman and director of Poker Programming at the online gaming website Great Eight aka GR88.com.

In 2012, Brad Booth publicly admitted that he'd failed to repay $28,000 he was loaned from fellow poker player Doug Polk, as well as various amounts loaned from other poker pros.

Personal life
On July 30, 2020, Booth was reported missing since July 13, after telling his roommate he was going camping. The roommate related Booth had only taken enough supplies "for a day or two".

On September 16, 2020, a post was made on the Facebook page “Let’s find Brad Booth,” with a message from his family, stating that they have "confirmation that Brad is alive and well" and that he "has been taking some time to himself,” adding that they "do not have any further information at this time.”

See also
List of people who disappeared

Notes

External links
 Discussion about the outstanding debts on 2+2, 2012

1976 births
2020s missing person cases
Canadian poker players
Living people
Missing people
Missing person cases in Nevada